Vidyadaan Institute of Technology and Management is a college established in 2010 in Buxar, Bihar, India. It is first engineering college in Bihar affiliated to Aryabhatta Knowledge University.

Academics
The college awards Bachelor of Engineering in several fields of engineering like B.Tech in Information Technology, Computer Science and Engineering, Electronics and Communications Engineering and Electrical and Electronics Engineering.

See also
 List of institutions of higher education in Bihar
 Education in Patna
 Education in Bihar
 Education in India

References

External links
 Vidyadaan Institute of Technology and Management website

Educational institutions established in 2010
2010 establishments in Bihar
Engineering colleges in Bihar
Colleges affiliated to Aryabhatta Knowledge University
Buxar district